Pachyna is a genus of moths in the family Lasiocampidae first described by Weymer in 1892.

Species
Pachyna bogema Zolotuhin & Gurkovich, 2009
Pachyna crabik Zolotuhin & Gurkovich, 2009
Pachyna satanas Zolotuhin & Gurkovich, 2009
Pachyna subfascia Walker, 1855

References

Lasiocampidae
Moth genera